Symphonia is a genus of moths of the family Crambidae.

Species
Symphonia albioculalis Hampson, 1906
Symphonia leucostictalis Hampson, 1906
Symphonia marionalis Viette, 1958
Symphonia multipictalis Hampson, 1896 (from Sri Lanka)
Symphonia nymphulalis Marion & Viette, 1956 (from Madagascar)

Former species
Symphonia secunda Strand, 1919
Symphonia trivitralis  (Warren, 1895)

References

Natural History Museum Lepidoptera genus database

Acentropinae
Crambidae genera
Taxa named by George Hampson